Decision in the Desert is a computer wargame  designed by Sid Meier and Ed Bever and published by MicroProse in 1985. Versions were released for the Apple II, Atari 8-bit, Commodore 64, and IBM PC compatibles.

Gameplay
Decision in the Desert is a game in which five battles are depicted: Sidi Barrani, Crusader, Gazala, First Alamein and Alam Halfa.

Reception
M. Evan Brooks reviewed the game for Computer Gaming World, and stated that "While DITD lacks a campaign scenario, the scale offers a reasonable explanation."

Reviews
Zzap! - Dec, 1985
Computer Gamer #8 (1985-11)
Computer Gaming World - Nov, 1991

References

External links
Review in Antic
Review in Commodore Power/Play
Review in ANALOG Computing
Review in Family Computing
Review in Compute!'s Gazette
Review in Page 6
Article in Tilt (French)
Article in Commodore Disk User
Review in Ahoy!
Article in VideoGames & Computer Entertainment

1985 video games
Apple II games
Atari 8-bit family games
Commodore 64 games
Computer wargames
MicroProse games
North African campaign
Turn-based strategy video games
Video games about Nazi Germany
Video games developed in the United States
Video games set in Egypt
Video games set in Libya
World War II video games